In Greek mythology, Megapenthes (Ancient Greek: Μεγαπένθης), the illegitimate son of Menelaus, king of Mycenaean Sparta, by a slave. He married Alector's daughter, Iphiloche (or Echemela). His name means 'great sorrow'.

Mythology
Megapenthes was mentioned as early as Homer's Odyssey, where Menelaus marries him to the Spartan Alector's daughter, and is described as:
stalwart Megapenthes, who was his [Menelaus's] son well-beloved, born of a slave woman;

The mythographer Apollodorus, says that the name of his slave mother was Pieris or Tereis:
Menelaus had ... by a female slave Pieris, an Aetolian, or, according to Acusilaus, by Tereis, he had a son Megapenthes;"

According to the geographer Pausanias, because Megapenthes and his brother Nicostratus were the sons of Menelaus by a slave, and thus illegitimate, Agamemnon's son Orestes succeeded Menelaus as king of Sparta. Pausanias also says that, according to the Rhodians, when Orestes was "still wandering" (being chased by the Erinyes because of his killing of his mother Clytemenestra), Nicostratus and Megapenthes drove out Helen, who found refuge on Rhodes with Polyxo.

Pausanias reports seeing Megapenthes and Nicostratus depicted riding a single horse, on the sixth century BC Doric-Ionic temple complex at Amyclae known as the throne of Apollo, designed by Bathycles of Magnesia.

Notes

References 
 Apollodorus, Apollodorus, The Library, with an English Translation by Sir James George Frazer, F.B.A., F.R.S. in 2 Volumes. Cambridge, Massachusetts, Harvard University Press; London, William Heinemann Ltd. 1921. . Online version at the Perseus Digital Library.
 Fowler, R. L., Early Greek Mythography: Volume 2: Commentary, Oxford University Press, 2013. .
 Gardner, Ernest Arthur, A Handbook of Greek Sculpture, Macmillan and Co,. Limited, London, 1911.
 Grimal, Pierre, The Dictionary of Classical Mythology, Wiley-Blackwell, 1996. .
 Hard, Robin, The Routledge Handbook of Greek Mythology: Based on H.J. Rose's "Handbook of Greek Mythology", Psychology Press, 2004, . Google Books.
 Homer, The Odyssey with an English Translation by A.T. Murray, PH.D. in two volumes. Cambridge, Massachusetts, Harvard University Press; London, William Heinemann, Ltd. 1919. Online version at the Perseus Digital Library.
 Pausanias, Pausanias Description of Greece with an English Translation by W.H.S. Jones, Litt.D., and H.A. Ormerod, M.A., in 4 Volumes. Cambridge, Massachusetts, Harvard University Press; London, William Heinemann Ltd. 1918. Online version at the Perseus Digital Library.
 Parada, Carlos, Genealogical Guide to Greek Mythology, Jonsered, Paul Åströms Förlag, 1993. .
 Tripp, Edward, Crowell's Handbook of Classical Mythology, Thomas Y. Crowell Co; First edition (June 1970). .

Princes in Greek mythology
Laconian characters in Greek mythology
Laconian mythology